The William G. Harrison House is a historic residence in Nashville, Georgia. It is also known as the Eulalie Taylor House and is located at 313 South Bartow Street.  It was built in 1904 and is a one-story frame Queen Anne-style house with Folk Victorian details.

It was added to the National Register of Historic Places on January 30, 1995.  It was deemed architecturally significant "as a good and exceptionally intact example of a Queen Anne-type cottage with Folk Victorian detailing built at the turn of the [20th] century".  Features consistent with the Queen Anne cottage style are:
characteristic square layout with projecting gables to front and side
rooms are asymmetrical and there is no central hallway
pyramidal roof (hipped roof would also be consistent)
interior-located chimney
built in early 1900s in a rural area (while also popular in both urban and rural areas in 1880s and 1890s)

William G. Harrison (1868–1923), a local lawyer and businessman, had the home built and lived in it until his death.

See also
National Register of Historic Places listings in Berrien County, Georgia

References

External links
 

Houses on the National Register of Historic Places in Georgia (U.S. state)
Buildings and structures in Berrien County, Georgia
Queen Anne cottages
Houses completed in 1904
Queen Anne architecture in Georgia (U.S. state)